Christian Vande Velde (born May 22, 1976) is a retired American professional road racing cyclist of Belgian descent, who rode professionally between 1998 and 2013. He has been a cycling analyst for NBC Sports since 2014. He is the son of United States Bicycling Hall of Fame inductee John Vande Velde.

Career

1998–2006
Vande Velde started his Grand Tour career by participating in the 1998 Vuelta a España, where he assisted Lance Armstrong, to a fourth-place finish. Vande Velde twice rode on the Tour de France team that brought Lance Armstrong to victory, in 1999, and 2001. In the 1999 Tour de France, Vande Velde was for a time the leader of the young rider classification; he did not compete, however, in the 2000 Tour de France. During this time, he worked as a domestique, riding in support of varying team captains, even though the 2005 season saw Vande Velde taking chances of his own. In one instance, Vande Velde was a breakaway participant on the fourth stage of the Eneco Tour. The breakaway, however, was eventually hampered when the peloton was led on a false route, meaning the breakaway riders had to wait for the peloton to get back on track, at which time the gap between the break and the peloton was reduced from six to four minutes with 43 kilometres to go.

At the 2006 Tour de Luxembourg, Vande Velde showed impressive performances in the mountains, which secured him first overall in the general classification.

Vande Velde was the best of the climbers in the team apart from Sastre and Schleck, whom he supported in the high mountain stages. On Stage 16, he pulled for most of the early slopes of the Col de la Croix de Fer, after which, team-mates Sastre and Schleck attacked to put then race leader Floyd Landis under pressure.

2007–2011

With 's team time trial win, Vande Velde became the first American to wear the pink jersey as leader of the general classification since Andrew Hampsten in 1988. Vande Velde finished the 2008 Tour de France in fourth place, 3'05" behind the winner Carlos Sastre, and seventeenth in the Olympic Road Race. In the 2009 Tour de France, Vande Velde finished seventh in the overall standings.

Vande Velde won the 2008 Tour of Missouri, beating the likes of Michael Rogers and Svein Tuft, who finished second and third, respectively.

Vande Velde crashed out of the 2010 Giro d'Italia on the third stage with a suspected clavicle break. Coincidentally, in 2009 he was forced out of the Giro after a crash, also on stage three. Vande Velde withdrew from the 2010 Tour de France upon completing the second stage, with two broken ribs.  The crash was caused by oil leaking from a fallen television motorcycle.

During the 2011 Tour de France, Vande Velde assisted Tom Danielson to a top ten finish, and was an integral part of 's first place in the team classification. Vande Velde finished a close second at the 2011 USA Pro Cycling Challenge, which was ultimately won by Levi Leipheimer.

2012–2013

In the 2012 Giro d'Italia, Vande Velde was instrumental to the victory of his leader Ryder Hesjedal, protecting him in the mountain stages. He also was Hesjedal's roommate during the Giro, and shared his thoughts about the race, and his teammate in an interview with Velo News, where he stated that winning the Giro was "surreal". Suffering various crashes during the first week, Vande Velde, however, finished second in the fifteenth stage of the 2012 Tour de France, losing in a sprint to the finish to Frenchman Pierrick Fedrigo. NBC Sports commentator Phil Liggett stated that amongst fans, Vande Velde was considered the most popular rider. With that run, he took the leader's jersey off the shoulders of 's Levi Leipheimer, and stepped atop the overall classification podium.

During Vande Velde's first race of the season, the 2013 Volta a Catalunya, Vande Velde crashed out with a metacarpal fracture. Vande Velde started the 2013 Giro d'Italia hoping to assist teammate Ryder Hesjedal in a repeat victory, however, Hesjedal withdrew following stage twelve. After Hesjedal's departure, Vande Velde struggled through the race, and finished hundred-tenth overall. Following his disappointing Giro, Vande Velde rode the 2013 Tour de France, but withdrew on stage seven due to sustained injuries from stage five. After the Tour de France, Vande Velde attempted to defend his USA Pro Cycling Challenge title, however, he rode a quiet race, and finished twenty-second overall. Vande Velde's strongest performance during the race was on stage five, when he placed ninth in the uphill individual time trial.

Vande Velde retired from professional cycling at the conclusion of the 2013 UCI World Team Time Trial Championships.

Doping confession

In a September 2012, online forum post, Garmin-Sharp team manager and owner Jonathan Vaughters stated that Vande Velde had used blood doping products to increase red blood cell production. On October 10, 2012, it was announced by USADA that he would be suspended for six months for admissions of doping during his time with the US Postal Cycling Team. Later that day a statement was released confirming his acceptance of a six-month ban from September 1, 2012, ending on March 1, 2013, along with a stripping of all race results between June 4, 2004, and April 30, 2006. Vande Velde released his own statement a day later that expressed regret at his decision to "cross the line". "I'm very sorry for the mistakes I made in my past and I know that forgiveness is a lot to ask for. I know that I have to earn it and I will try, every day, to deserve it – as I have, every day, since making the choice to compete clean. I will never give up on this sport, and I will never stop fighting for its future." he said.

Personal life

Vande Velde currently resides in Greenville, South Carolina with his wife Leah, and their daughters Uma (b. 2008), and Madeline (b. 2009). He is an alumnus of Lemont High School.

Career achievements

Major results

1999
 1st Overall  Redlands Bicycle Classic
 3rd Overall Four Days of Dunkirk
1st  Young rider classification
 4th Overall Circuit de la Sarthe
2000
 9th Grand Prix Eddy Merckx
2001
 4th Overall Three Days of De Panne
 5th Overall Volta a la Comunitat Valenciana
2002
 1st Stage 1 (TTT) Volta a Catalunya
2004

2005
 1st  Mountains classification Eneco Tour

2006
 1st Overall  Tour de Luxembourg
 2nd Overall Tour of Elk Grove
 9th Overall Tour of California
2007
 1st Eindhoven Team Time Trial
 2nd Overall Tour de Georgia
 6th Overall Tour of California
2008
 1st USA Cycling Professional Tour
 Giro d'Italia
1st Stage 1 (TTT)
Held  after Stage 1
 1st  Overall  Tour of Missouri
1st Stage 3 (TTT)
 2nd Overall Circuit de la Sarthe
1st Stage 2
 2nd Overall Tour of the Bahamas
 3rd Time trial, National Road Championships
 3rd Overall Tour of California
 4th Overall Tour de France
 7th Overall Tour de Georgia
1st Stage 4 (TTT)
 10th Overall Vuelta a Castilla y León
2009
 1st Stage 4 Paris–Nice
 7th Overall Tour de France
2011
 1st Stage 2 (TTT) Tour de France
 2nd Overall USA Pro Cycling Challenge
 4th Overall Tour of California
 5th Overall Tour of Oman
 6th Overall Tour of Utah
2012
 1st  Overall USA Pro Cycling Challenge
 1st Stage 4 (TTT) Giro d'Italia
 1st Stage 2 (TTT) Tour of Utah

Grand Tour general classification results timeline

Did not finish = DNF; In progress = IP; Voided results = struck through.

References

External links

 
 Cycling Base: Christian Vande Velde
 Cycling Quotient: Christian Vande Velde

American male cyclists
American sportspeople in doping cases
1976 births
Living people
Cyclists at the 2000 Summer Olympics
Cyclists at the 2008 Summer Olympics
Olympic cyclists of the United States
People from Lemont, Illinois
Cyclists from Illinois
American people of Belgian descent
Doping cases in cycling